Qoran Talar (also Romanized as Qorān Tālār and Qorān Tālar; also known as Qorān Qālū) is a village in Babol Kenar Rural District, Babol Kenar District, Babol County, Mazandaran Province, Iran. At the 2006 census, its population was 440, in 135 families.

References 

Populated places in Babol County